Deh-e Gholam Naruyi (also Romanized as Deh-e Gholām Nārūyī) is a village in Dust Mohammad Rural District, in the Central District of Hirmand County, Sistan and Baluchestan Province, Iran. At the 2006 census, its population was 76, in 14 families.

References 

Populated places in Hirmand County